"Sedona" is the first single on Houndmouth's second studio album Little Neon Limelight.

Chart positions

Weekly charts

Year-end charts

Certifications

References

2015 songs
Rough Trade Records singles